Events from the year 1776 in art.

Events
 John Robert Cozens sets out on a three-year tour of Switzerland and Italy.

Works
 Pompeo Batoni – General William Gordon of Fyvie
 Nathaniel Dance-Holland – The Dashwoods at West Wycombe Park
 Jean-Honoré Fragonard – A Young Girl Reading (approximate date)
 Thomas Gainsborough – Portrait of Johann Christian Bach
 Tilly Kettle – The ceremony of a gentoo woman taking leave of her relations and distributing her jewels prior to ascending the funeral pyre of her deceased husband
 Anton Raphael Mengs – Self-portrait
 Sir Joshua Reynolds – Huang Ya Dong ('Wang-Y-Tong')

Births
 February 16 – Abraham Raimbach, English engraver (died 1843)
 March 30 – Vasily Andreevich Tropinin, Russian painter (died 1857)
 April 2 – John Higton, English animal painter (died 1827)
 April 13 – Félix Boisselier, French historical painter (died 1811)
 June 11 – John Constable, English romantic landscape painter (died 1837)
 June 12 – Pierre Révoil, French painter (died 1842)
 June 29 – František Horčička, Czech history and portrait painter (died 1856)
 August 9 – Jacob Munch, Norwegian painter and military officer (died 1839)
 August 14 – Christian Friedrich Tieck, German sculptor (died 1851)
 August 15 – Gottlieb Schick, German Neoclassical portrait painter (died 1812)
 August 16 – Amalia von Helvig, German and Swedish artist, writer, translator and intellectual (died 1831)
 October 8 – Pieter van Os, Dutch painter and engraver (died 1839)
 October 18 – John Vanderlyn, American Neoclassical painter (died 1852)
 November 5 – Abraham Teerlink, Dutch painter (died 1857)
 December 26 – Charles Hamilton Smith, Flemish-born English illustrator and soldier (died 1859)
 date unknown
 Élise Bruyère, French painter specializing in portraits and floral still lifes (died 1847)
 Alexei Yegorov, Russian painter (died 1861)
 Jan Mooy, Dutch marine art painter (died 1847)
 Carlo Restallino, Italian painter and engraver (died 1864)
 Gustava Johanna Stenborg, Swedish textile artist (died 1819)

Deaths
 February 2 – Francis Hayman, painter and illustrator (born 1708)
 March 4 - Johann Georg Ziesenis, German-Danish portrait painter (born 1716)
 March 18 – Gerard Vandergucht, English born engraver and art dealer (born c.1696)
 April 1 – Gaetano Lapis, Italian painter (born 1704)
 May 4 – Jacques Saly, French sculptor (born 1717)
 July 29 – Charles Francois Hutin, French history and figure painter, engraver and sculptor (born 1715)
 August – Lorenzo Baldissera Tiepolo, painter (born 1736)
 September 22 – Giuseppe Peroni, Italian painter of frescoes (born 1700)
 date unknown
 Vittorio Bigari, Italian painter (born 1692)
 Angelica Le Gru Perotti, Italian painter (born 1719)
 Thomas Pingo, medallist and engraver (born 1692)
 Ike no Taiga, Japanese painter and calligrapher (born 1723)
 Mattheus Verheyden, Dutch painter (born 1700)

 
Years of the 18th century in art
1770s in art